For We Are Many (sometimes written as ...For We Are Many) is the fifth studio album by American metalcore band All That Remains.

Released on October 12, 2010, it is the third album by the band to be produced by the Killswitch Engage guitarist, Adam Dutkiewicz, who also produced This Darkened Heart and The Fall of Ideals.

Background
For We Are Many is the first All That Remains album to contain the same line-up as the preceding album, a tradition that would continue up through 2015's The Order of Things. On August 18, 2010, the band made the title track downloadable for free. On September 2, the band released the first single to go to rock radio, "Hold On", on their official YouTube channel, while its music video was released on October 6. On April 1, 2011, a music video for "The Last Time" was released.

Reception

The album sold 29,000 copies in its first week. The album peaked at number 10 on the US Billboard 200 and peaked at number 7 on the Canadian Albums Chart.

The album has received mainly positive reviews. AllMusic gave the album 3 out of 5 stars, stating that it "feels like a throwback to the NWOBHM at times evoking hints of Iron Maiden and Judas Priest." They also stated that the album had a good mix of "heaviness and harmony".

Track listing

Personnel

All That Remains
 Philip Labonte – lead vocals
 Oli Herbert – lead guitar, backing vocals
 Mike Martin – rhythm guitar, backing vocals
 Jeanne Sagan – bass guitar, backing vocals
 Jason Costa – drums, percussion

Production
 Adam Dutkiewicz – producer, engineering, mixing at Wicked Good Recording Studios, original production
 Jim Fogarty – assistant engineering
 Brian Virtue – additional production
 Rob Graves – additional production
 Ryan Smith – mastering at Sterling Sound, New York City

Artwork
 Travis Smith – artwork design

Charts

References

2010 albums
All That Remains (band) albums
Prosthetic Records albums
Razor & Tie albums
Albums produced by Adam Dutkiewicz